Aryeh Judah Löb ben Chayim Priluk was a 17th-century Polish Jewish author.

He wrote a commentary on the Zohar from the parashot Shemot to Ḥukat, which was published, with the Sefer Yirah, in Berlin in 1724. The latter book also is credited to him.

References
 

17th-century Jews
17th-century Polish writers
Authors of Kabbalistic works
Bible commentators
Jewish Polish writers